Beta integral may refer to:

beta function
Barnes beta integral